Melrose Township is one of twenty-two townships in Adams County, Illinois, United States. As of the 2020 census, its population was 5,748 and it contained 2,375 housing units. The northwestern part of the township has been separated into Quincy Township.

Geography

Unincorporated towns
 Sheridan Estates

Cemeteries
The township contains four cemeteries: Ehe, Melrose Chapel, Mount Carmel and Saint Anthonys.

Major highways
  Interstate 172 (spur of Interstate 72)
  US Route 24
  Illinois State Route 57
  Illinois State Route 104
  Illinois State Route 336

Airports and landing strips
 Seigfried Halfpap Airport

Rivers
 Mississippi River

Lakes
 Big Lake
 Snyder Lake
 Turtle Lake

Landmarks
 Indian Mounds Park (east edge)
 Lock and Dam No. 21

Demographics
As of the 2020 census there were 5,748 people, 2,358 households, and 1,668 families residing in the township. The racial makeup of the township was 93.34% White, 1.22% African American, 0.00% Native American, 0.71% Asian, 0.02% Pacific Islander, 0.61% from other races, and 4.11% from two or more races. Hispanic or Latino of any race were 1.44% of the population.

There were 2,358 households, out of which 23.20% had children under the age of 18 living with them, 60.73% were married couples living together, 8.23% had a female householder with no spouse present, and 29.26% were non-families. 20.30% of all households were made up of individuals, and 7.60% had someone living alone who was 65 years of age or older. The average household size was 2.35 and the average family size was 2.75.

The township's age distribution consisted of 19.4% under the age of 18, 9.4% from 18 to 24, 17.6% from 25 to 44, 33.6% from 45 to 64, and 20.1% who were 65 years of age or older. The median age was 49.1 years. For every 100 females, there were 99.5 males. For every 100 females age 18 and over, there were 97.3 males.

The median income for a household in the township was $75,596, and the median income for a family was $88,750. Males had a median income of $47,607 versus $34,399 for females. The per capita income for the township was $43,508. About 10.9% of families and 8.3% of the population were below the poverty line, including 7.9% of those under age 18 and 1.3% of those age 65 or over.

School districts
 Payson Community Unit School District 1
 Quincy School District 172

Political districts
 Illinois' 17th congressional district
 State House District 93
 State Senate District 47

References
 
 United States Census Bureau 2007 TIGER/Line Shapefiles
 United States National Atlas

External links
 List of Adams County township trustees
 City-Data.com
 Illinois State Archives

Townships in Adams County, Illinois
1849 establishments in Illinois
Townships in Illinois